Humphrey Head is a limestone outcrop situated south of the village of Allithwaite in Cumbria, England. It is whale-back-shaped and accessible for walkers, giving views over Morecambe Bay to Lancaster, Morecambe, Heysham and over the Leven estuary to Ulverston. There is an Ordnance Survey trig point at the top.

Since 1906 it has been the home of Humphrey Head Outdoor Centre, currently operated by Mere Mountains.  Most of the Head is a nature reserve, managed by Cumbria Wildlife Trust since 1992 although still owned by the Holker Estate.  On the eastern flank is a wood with permitted rights of way. It used to be possible to walk to the end of the outcrop by walking on the sands to the west of Humphrey Head, but changes in the sands have rendered this difficult (although still possible in wellies) (2011). To the east of Humphrey Head is a marsh which forms part of Kents Bank.

Humphrey Head is the traditional location for the killing of the last wolf in England, in about 1390.  Folklore has it that the wolf descended the fells from near Coniston where it had caused havoc among the sheep flocks.  After it attacked a child in Cark the country-folk chased it to the end of Humphrey Head where it was killed with pikes while hiding among the rocks.

Below Humphrey Head there used to be house with a spring.  The water was reputed to have therapeutic properties.  Miners from Durham used to walk here just to take the water.  All that is now left is a rusting lead pipe and a clear trickle of water.

On the rock face lies a memorial to William Pedder who died in August 1857, it reads: "Beware how you on these rocks ascend Here William pedder met his end August 22nd 1857 Aged 10 years by permission".

He describes a walk from Kents Bank railway station.

References 

Landforms of Cumbria
Nature reserves of the Cumbria Wildlife Trust
Sites of Special Scientific Interest in Cumbria
Rock formations of England